Aphelenchoididea is a nematode superfamily in the order Rhabditida.
Its members can be found inside bodies of species from the families Lepidoptera and Blattodea.

Taxonomy
 recorded in WoRMS, the superfamily contains the following families:
Aphelenchidae 
Aphelenchus 
Paraphelenchus 
Aphelenchoididae 
Aphelenchoides
Paraseinura 

Records in ITIS contain the following two families as well:
Myenchildae
Paraphelenchidae

The following were formerly members of this superfamily, but are now assigned to other taxa:
 Acugutturidae: Now belongs to Panagrolaimida.
 Berntsenidae
 Ektaphelenchidae
 Entaphelenchidae
 Parasitaphelenchidae
 Seinuridae

References

External links

Aphelenchida
Animal superfamilies